The Commander of the Office of Special Investigations (OSI/CC) heads the Office of Special Investigations (OSI) and derives its independent criminal investigative authority directly from the Secretary of the Air Force. OSI is also a field operating agency under the administrative guidance and oversight of the Inspector General of the Department of the Air Force.

Brigadier General Terry L. Bullard is the current and 19th Commander of OSI.

By federal statue, OSI is a federal law enforcement agency with responsibility for conducting criminal investigations, counterintelligence, specialized investigative activities, protective service operations and integrated force protection for the Air Force and Space Force. OSI is also a combat-ready military criminal investigative organization that provides the Air Force and Space Force a wartime capability with counterintelligence support to force protection to find, fix, track and neutralize enemy threats in hostile and uncertain environments. OSI is the Air Force and Space Force's focal point for working with U.S. and foreign nation law enforcement and security services in order to provide timely and accurate threat information in all environments. The activities of OSI are conducted by a worldwide network of over 2,000 military and civilian special agents stationed at major Air Force and Space Force installations and a variety of worldwide special operating locations.

List of Commanders of the Office of Special Investigations

See also

 List of Secretaries of the Air Force
 List of Inspector Generals of the Department of the Air Force
 List of Air Force Judge Advocate Generals
 List of United States federal law enforcement agencies

Military Criminal Investigative Organizations
United States Army Criminal Investigation Command (USACIDC or CID)
United States Army Counterintelligence (USAI or CI)
Naval Criminal Investigative Service (NCIS)
Defense Criminal Investigative Service (DCIS)
Coast Guard Investigative Service (CGIS)

References

United States Department of Defense
United States Air Force
United States Space Force
1948 establishments in the United States
United States Air Force Office of Special Investigations
United States Air Force appointments
United States Air Force generals